Yasemin Kozanoğlu (born 7 July 1978) is a Turkish actress and model

Biography
Yasemin Kozanoğlu was born to businessman Ahmet Kozanoğlu and socialite Ahu Tuğbay. She studied at Eseniş High School and later did video production in England. She started modelling and became one of the most prominent models in Turkey. Kozanoğlu began her acting career, her most notable roles are as Duygu Güner in the TV series Avcı and in the films Çilekli Pasta, Romantik and Yeşil Işık.

References

External links

Yasemin Kozanoğlu ~ SinemaTürk

1978 births
Living people
Actresses from Istanbul
Turkish female models
Turkish film actresses
Turkish television actresses
20th-century Turkish actresses